The R330 road is a regional road in west central County Mayo in Ireland. It meets the R300 road between Cloonee and Partry.

The government legislation that defines the R330, the Roads Act 1993 (Classification of Regional Roads) Order 2012 (Statutory Instrument 54 of 2012), provides the following official description:

R330: Westport — Partry, County Mayo

Between its junction with the N5 at Bridge Street in the town of Westport and its junction with N84 at Partry in the county of Mayo via Mill Street, Altamount Street and Ballinrobe Road in the town of Westport: Knockroosky, Aille, Killavally, Cloonee and Ballynanerroon in the county of Mayo.

See also
List of roads of County Mayo
National primary road
National secondary road
Regional road
Roads in Ireland

References

Regional roads in the Republic of Ireland
Roads in County Mayo